Brachaciptera is a genus of longhorn beetles of the subfamily Cerambycinae, containing the following species:

 Brachaciptera auricoma Lea, 1917
 Brachaciptera tibialis Lea, 1917

References

Cerambycinae